Dr. Hienadź Karpienka (Gennady Karpenko, September 17, 1949 – April 6, 1999) was a Belarusian scientist and an important politician in opposition to president Alexander Lukashenko.

Hienadz Karpienka was born in Minsk.

In 1987 he was director of the Maladzyechna metallurgy plant.

In 1990 Karpienka defended his doctorate dissertation "Technology of Materials".

Karpienka was author of 50 inventions, which were implemented in 15 countries. In 1994 he was elected corresponding member of the National Academy of Sciences of Belarus.

Karpienka was the MP of two Belarusian parliaments, he was the lead for the commission on science and technology. He was also a member and one of the leaders of the United Civic Party.

In 1992 he became Head of Maladzyechna Executive Committee (i.e. the city mayor). Within two years of becoming  mayor, Hienadz Karpienka introduced several local economic reforms, established musical and theatrical festivals, founded a local football club and performed a radical de-sovietization of the city's street names.

In 1996 Karpienka was leading the initiative to  impeach President Lukashenka, although this initiative lacked significant support.

In 1998 Karpienka was head of the National Executive Committee, an oppositional shadow government. He was considered as the leader of the Belarusian opposition and as the most probable oppositional candidate for the upcoming presidential elections.

Unclear circumstances of death

On March 31, 1999 Karpienka was taken to the 9th Minsk city hospital with an apparent cerebral hemorrhage. On April 1 he was operated on, but did not regain consciousness. He died on April 6 at seven in the morning.

The death of Hienadz Karpienka was very unexpected, there was no history of such health problems. A month after Karipenka's death, Jury Zacharanka, one of his closest friends and colleagues, was abducted. Within 6 months the same happened to Karpienka's second close colleague Viktar Hanchar. Some in the Belarusian opposition, including Karpienka's family believe these incidents are related.

References

External links
 Hienadz Karpienka's Curriculum vitae on the NASRB official website
 We remember... Gennady Karpenko
 Gennady Karpenko: Lived Open, Decent and Brave Life
 United Civic Party leader pays tribute to late opposition politician Karpenka
 Film "Ploshcha" mentions about Karpienka at 1:00:00 

1949 births
1999 deaths
Scientists from Minsk
United Civic Party of Belarus politicians
Members of the Congress of People's Deputies of the Soviet Union
Members of the Supreme Soviet of the Byelorussian Soviet Socialist Republic
Members of the Supreme Council of Belarus
Politicians from Minsk
Recipients of the Byelorussian SSR State Prize